Forest Alven Maddox (November 30, 1897 – August 4, 1929) was an American Negro league outfielder in the 1920s.

A native of Fulton County, Georgia, Maddox attended Morehouse College. He played for the Birmingham Black Barons in 1923, posting three hits in 19 plate appearances over seven recorded games. Maddox died in Atlanta, Georgia in 1929 at age 31.

References

External links
Baseball statistics and player information from Baseball-Reference Black Baseball Stats and Seamheads

1897 births
1929 deaths
Birmingham Black Barons players
Baseball outfielders
Baseball players from Georgia (U.S. state)
People from Fulton County, Georgia
20th-century African-American sportspeople